Jo, the Beautiful Irishwoman is the title of a series of four oil on canvas bust-length portraits by Gustave Courbet. They all show the same redheaded Irish model Joanna Hiffernan (c.1843 – c.1905) looking in a mirror – she also modelled for Whistler. The works have minor differences in details and dimensions but their exact chronology is unknown. They are now in the Nationalmuseum, the Metropolitan Museum of Art, the Nelson-Atkins Museum of Art and a private collection.

History
The nickname in the title indicates the friendship between the artist and his model and is unusual for contemporary portraits of women in that it gives the model's first name. They were probably painted in Trouville, where the painter spent August to November 1865 painting seascapes with Whistler and Joanna. On 17 November, towards the end of his stay, he wrote to his parents that he "bore himself admirably" and told them that he was Whistler's "pupil". Whistler himself painted the portrait Courbet by the River or My Dear Courbet during the latter's stay with him.

Courbet had already painted a series of paintings of women looking in mirrors in 1860 - this had been quite successful with the public and was exhibited in Brussels. The best known from that series, Woman with a Mirror, was painted in Ornans in winter 1859–1860 and is now in the Kunstmuseum  Basel – it shows a brunette with a mirror (almost identical to that in Jo) and a prominent décolletage.

Four versions

References

Portraits of women
19th-century portraits
1865 paintings
1866 paintings
Paintings in the collection of the Metropolitan Museum of Art
Paintings in the collection of the Nelson-Atkins Museum of Art
Paintings in the collection of the Nationalmuseum Stockholm
Paintings by Gustave Courbet